The Washington Potomacs were a Negro league baseball team in the Eastern Colored League, based in Washington, D.C., in 1924. They also operated as an independent team in 1923. In 1925 the Potomacs moved to Wilmington, Delaware where they played as the Wilmington Potomacs for the 1925 season. In mid-July, George Robinson, owner of the Potomacs, announced that his team was folding and was unable to complete the season. The league contracted to seven teams and the Potomacs players were dispersed to other teams.

References

External links
 Franchise history at Seamheads.com

African-American history of Washington, D.C.
Negro league baseball teams
Baseball teams in Washington, D.C.
1923 establishments in Washington, D.C.
Baseball teams established in 1923
1925 disestablishments in Delaware
Sports clubs disestablished in 1925
Baseball teams disestablished in 1925